John Hillric Bonn (1829 – November 15, 1891)  was the first president of the North Hudson County Railway and remained so until his death in 1891, a period of twenty-six years. He also was one of the founders of the Eldorado Amusement Park in Weehawken, New Jersey.

Biography
He was born in 1829 in Friesland, Germany. He migrated to the United States in 1857 and married Angelique Bonjer.  

He founded and became the first president of the North Hudson County Railway in 1865. 

On October 18, 1891 it was announced that the Hoboken Land and Improvement Company was purchasing his holdings for $2,500,000 (approximately $ today). 

He died on November 15, 1891 in Weehawken, New Jersey of a cerebral aneurysm.

References

19th-century American railroad executives
1829 births
1891 deaths
German emigrants to the United States
People from Weehawken, New Jersey